The Adam Lobell House is a historic house located at 15715 LA 16 in French Settlement, Louisiana.

Built in c.1862 for Adam Lobell, the house is a one-story frame cottage in French Creole style. It remained property of the Lobell family for three generations until it was sold to Robert and Florita Denny. Despite a certain number of alterations, the house retains its historic integrity.

The house was listed on the National Register of Historic Places on May 14, 1992.

See also
 National Register of Historic Places listings in Livingston Parish, Louisiana

References

Houses on the National Register of Historic Places in Louisiana
Creole architecture in Louisiana
Houses completed in 1862
Houses in Livingston Parish, Louisiana
National Register of Historic Places in Livingston Parish, Louisiana
1862 establishments in Louisiana